Las Marías is a town and municipality of Puerto Rico located north of Maricao; southeast of Añasco; south of San Sebastián; east of Mayagüez; and west of Lares. Las Marías is spread over 13 barrios and Las Marías Pueblo (the downtown area and the administrative center of the city).

History
Las Marías was founded on July 1, 1871. Don Benito Recio y Moreno was the acting mayor during the founding of Las Marías.

Puerto Rico was ceded by Spain in the aftermath of the Spanish–American War under the terms of the Treaty of Paris of 1898 and became a territory of the United States. In 1899, the United States Department of War conducted a census of Puerto Rico finding that the population of Las Marías was 11,279.

On September 20, 2017 Hurricane Maria struck the island of Puerto Rico.  In Las Marías, multiple landslides left highways covered in mud, trees and debris.  In some areas of Las Marías there were more than 25 landslides per square mile due to the significant amount of rainfall and wind.

Geography 

Las Marías is located on the central western side of Puerto Rico.

Río Grande de Añasco (also known as Río Guacio) is located in Las Marías.

Barrios
Like all municipalities of Puerto Rico, Las Marías is subdivided into barrios.

Alto Sano
Anones
Bucarabones
Buena Vista
Cerrote
Chamorro
Espino
Furnias
Las Marías barrio-pueblo
Maravilla Este
Maravilla Norte
Maravilla Sur
Naranjales
Palma Escrita
Purísima Concepción
Río Cañas

Sectors

Barrios (which are like minor civil divisions) in turn are further subdivided into smaller local populated place areas/units called sectores (sectors in English). The types of sectores may vary, from normally sector to urbanización to reparto to barriada to residencial, among others.

Special Communities

 (Special Communities of Puerto Rico) are marginalized communities whose citizens are experiencing a certain amount of social exclusion. A map shows these communities occur in nearly every municipality of the commonwealth. Of the 742 places that were on the list in 2014, the following 7 sectors were in Adjuntas: Sector La Josefa in Bucarabones, Sector Bryan in Cerróte, Sector Chamorro in Cerróte, Sector Palo Prieto in Palma Escrita, Sector Plato Indio in Río Cañas, Las Juanitas in Furnias, and Sector Santa Rosa in Furnias.

Demographics

Tourism
Paradise Camping Coffee Farm is a place for ecotourism and camping in Las Marías.

Landmarks and places of interest
Places of interest in Las Marías include:

Economy

Agriculture
Agriculture: bananas, coffee, and citrus.

Industry
Manufacturing: clothing.

Culture

Festivals and events
Las Marías celebrates its patron saint festival in December. The  is a religious and cultural celebration that generally features parades, games, artisans, amusement rides, regional food, and live entertainment.

Other festivals and events celebrated in Las Marías include:
 January - Three King's Festival
 March - Orange Festival. At the 2019 festival, a big name band, El Gran Combo performed at the festival, and a group of troubadours from Cuba performed with local Puerto Rican troubadours.
 March - Festival to commemorate the founding of Las Marías

Government

Like all municipalities in Puerto Rico, Las Marías is administered by a mayor. The current mayor is Edwin Soto Santiago, from the New Progressive Party (PNP). Soto Santiago was elected during the 2016 general election, having previously served office from 1997 to 2013.

The municipality belongs to the Puerto Rico Senatorial District IV, which is represented by two senators. In 2016, Luis Daniel Muñiz Cortés and Evelyn Vázquez were elected as District Senators.

Transportation
There are 13 bridges in Las Marías.

Symbols
The  has an official flag and coat of arms.

Flag
The flag is divided by an imaginary diagonal line whose ends are the upper left angle of the flag and the opposite lower angle. The upper part is yellow and the lower half is green. The yellow portion represents the sun bathing the town and the green portion represents the nature and vegetation of the municipality.

Coat of arms
The shield is divided into six parts with three in silver and three in blue. A María tree (Calophylum brasiliense antillanum), with a pair of coffee tree branches to the sides of its trunk, adorns each silver part. The monogram and crown of Nuestra Señora la Santísima Virgen de Plata is placed in the top center portion of the shield. The shield's border is red with a broken chain at the bottom. Above the shield resides three tower crown in gold.

See also

List of Puerto Ricans
History of Puerto Rico
Did you know-Puerto Rico?

References

External links
 Welcome to Puerto Rico! Las Marías

Municipalities of Puerto Rico
Populated places established in 1871
1871 establishments in Puerto Rico